Vilvoorde railway station, officially Vilvoorde, is a railway station in Vilvoorde, Flemish Brabant, Belgium. The station opened on 5 May 1835 on the country's first railway, from Brussels to Mechelen; later to become railway lines 25 and 27. Train services are operated the National Railway Company of Belgium (NMBS/SNCB).

As of 2021, the dilapidated quays and platforms are being renovated, the station building having been renovated a few years before.

Train services
The station is served by the following services:

Intercity services (IC-11) Binche - Braine-le-Comte - Halle - Brussels - Mechelen - Turnhout (weekdays)
Intercity services (IC-11) Binche - Braine-le-Comte - Halle - Brussels - Schaarbeek (weekends)
Intercity services (IC-22) Antwerp - Mechelen - Brussels
Intercity services (IC-31) Antwerp - Mechelen - Brussels (weekdays)
Intercity services (IC-31) Antwerp - Mechelen - Brussels - Nivelles - Charleroi (weekends)
Brussels GEN/RER services (S1) Antwerp - Mechelen - Brussels - Waterloo - Nivelles (weekdays)
Brussels GEN/RER services (S1) Antwerp - Mechelen - Brussels (weekends)
Brussels GEN/RER services (S4) Mechelen - Merode - Etterbeek - Brussels-Luxembourg - Denderleeuw - Aalst (weekdays)
Brussels GEN/RER services (S5) Mechelen - Brussels-Luxembourg - Etterbeek - Halle - Enghien (- Geraardsbergen) (weekdays)
Brussels GEN/RER services (S5) Mechelen - Brussels-Luxembourg - Etterbeek - Halle (weekends)
Brussels GEN/RER services (S7) Vilvoorde - Merode - Halle (weekdays)

See also
 List of railway stations in Belgium

References

External links
 Vilvoorde railway station at Belgian Railways website
Railway stations in Belgium
Railway stations in Flemish Brabant
Vilvoorde
Railway stations in Belgium opened in 1835